Pauli Jaks (born January 25, 1972) is a Swiss former professional ice hockey goaltender who played one game in the NHL with the Los Angeles Kings during the 1994–95 NHL season.

Biography
Jaks played in the 1985 Quebec International Pee-Wee Hockey Tournament with a Swiss-Italian youth team.

Jaks was selected in the 5th round (108th overall) in the 1991 NHL Entry Draft by the Los Angeles Kings. Jaks was the first Swiss-trained player to appear in the NHL. 

Jaks also played in the IHL for the Phoenix Roadrunners, but he is best known for his play in the Switzerland National League A. 

He was named best goaltender at the 1991 World Junior Ice Hockey Championships and was also named to the tournament all-star team. 

He has two children: Aleksander Nicolas (born 1999) and Krystian Dominik (born 2002).

See also
List of players who played only one game in the NHL

References

External links

1972 births
Living people
Avangard Omsk players
Genève-Servette HC players
HC Ambrì-Piotta players
HC Forward-Morges players
Los Angeles Kings draft picks
Los Angeles Kings players
People from Schaffhausen
Sportspeople from the canton of Schaffhausen
Phoenix Roadrunners (IHL) players
SCL Tigers players
Swiss expatriate ice hockey people
Swiss expatriate sportspeople in the United States
Swiss ice hockey goaltenders